Aribwatsa, also known as Lae or Lahe, is an extinct member of the Busu subgroup of Lower Markham languages in the area of Lae, Morobe Province, Papua New Guinea. Descendants of the Aribwatsa language community have mostly switched to the Bukawa language, which is spoken all along the north coast of the Huon Gulf and in several villages on the south coast.

References

Wurm, S.A. editor. Some Endangered Languages of Papua New Guinea: Kaki Ae, Musom, and Aribwatsa. D-89, vi + 183 pages. Pacific Linguistics, The Australian National University, 1997.

Markham languages
Extinct languages of Oceania
Languages of Morobe Province